Cyperus obtusus is a species of sedge that is native to parts of Mauritius.

See also 
 List of Cyperus species

References 

obtusus
Plants described in 1796
Flora of Mauritius